Ali II (Persian: علی) was a ruler of the Bavand dynasty who ruled briefly in 1271. He was the brother and successor of Muhammad. Nothing more is known about him; he died in 1271, and was succeeded by his cousin Yazdagird of Tabaristan.

Sources
 

13th-century Bavandid rulers
1271 deaths
Year of birth unknown